The Perfect Melody is an album by Puerto Rican singer Zion. It is his debut solo studio album. Production of the album was handled by several musical producers including Akon, Nely el Arma Secreta, Tainy, and others. Guest appearances include Akon, Eddie Dee, Tony Tun-Tun, De La Ghetto and Jowell & Randy, among others. After temporarily separating from the duo Zion & Lennox, Zion began recording material for his debut solo album in October 2006.

"The Way She Moves" featuring Akon was selected as the lead single from the album. The song was released to radio stations on June 12, 2007 and released as a digital download on April 9, 2008. "Zun Da Da" served as the second single and was released to radio stations on July 20, 2007 and released as a digital download on April 9, 2008, as well. The Perfect Melody received a nomination for a Lo Nuestro Award for Urban Album of the Year.

Background
Zion first became known in the duo Zion & Lennox. As a duo, they released one studio album, Motivando a la Yal (2004) and appeared on various compilation albums before then such as Luny Tunes Mas Flow (2003). Motivando a la Yal peaked at number thirty-two and number thirteen on the Billboard Latin Albums and Billboard Latin Pop Albums, respectively. The special edition re-release performed better, reaching number ten on the Billboard Latin Albums chart. The album was well received by critics, with Evan Gutierrez of Allmusic calling it a "landmark album" and "one of the albums that artists will refer to in years to come as one of the records that shaped reggaeton and its future". Zion began working on The Perfect Melody in October 2006. Originally, the album was to be a compilation album of various artist, though after "bad experiences with new talent", Zion decided to work the project alone.

Track listing

Tracks 1 & 14 written by Gabriel Cruz (Wise).

Charts
The album debuted at number 53 on the Billboard 200 and number two the Billboard Latin Albums chart, selling over 30,000 copies in its first week.  The album was certified Platinum (Latin) by the RIAA in July 2007.

Charts

Sales and certifications

References

Zion (artist) albums
2007 albums
Albums produced by Akon
Albums produced by Nely